The Suzuki FB engine is a series of two- and three-cylinder two-stroke engines that was produced by the Suzuki Motor Corporation from October 1961 until November 1987. They were used in a number of Kei-class automobiles and light trucks. From the original air-cooled  straight-twin version the FB series developed through a number of different models having different names, ending with the water-cooled, three-cylinder LJ50. The names used for various versions of this engine often refer to the chassis code of the cars in which they were introduced, until Suzuki changed their engine naming system sometime in the first half of the 1970s.

FB
The engine was first seen in air-cooled form, equipped with a single carburettor, in the 1961 Suzulight Carry FB. This engine has an alloy block and alloy head, betraying Suzuki's roots as a motorcycle manufacturer. It also received three main bearings. It originally developed  for this little commercial vehicle. For the June 1965 debut of a modernized Carry, the LC10 engine received a version of the Selmix automatic injection system which acted at the crank. This was later replaced by Suzuki's new self-lubricating "CCI" system (Cylinder Crank Injection). For the cabover L30 Carry of 1966, a horizontally-mounted version of the engine was developed on which the starter and generator are combined and mounted directly to the front of the crankshaft.

In 1969 a reed valve equipped version with increased power was first offered in the L40 Carry. This engine also equipped the brand new LJ10 Jimny off-roader. A  (still at 6000 rpm) version of the FB engine, now featuring Suzuki's improved "CCIS" (Cylinder Crank Injection System) lubrication system, appeared in the Jimny in January 1971 and subsequently in the Carry in April of the same year. This version of the engine weighs , excluding the transmission. The original air-cooled FB engine was discontinued in August 1972 (when the L40 van was replaced), as water-cooled engines were becoming more popular in the Kei segment.

Applications
 1961.10–1965.06 Suzulight Carry FB/FBD
 1965.06–1969.07 Suzulight/Suzuki Carry L20/L21
 1966.02–1969.07 Suzuki Carry L30/L31
 1969.07–1972.08 Suzuki Carry L40/L41
 1971.01–1972.03 Suzuki Jimny LJ10

FE
In 1963, a version for the front-wheel drive Suzulight 360 Van appeared. When intended for a FF layout, the engine was called the FE. The biggest improvement was the introduction of Suzuki's patented "SELMIX" automatic lubrication system. This added oil at the inlet and eliminated the need for pre-mixed gasoline, improving convenience, economy, and reliability. It was also offered as a Standard model ("FEB"), although this did not receive the SELMIX system. A  version appeared in the FE/FEA from April 1965 with an improved Selmix system which acted at the crank. The oil was scattered along the cylinder wall from the crank by centrifugal force.

In February 1966 the improved Selmix system was replaced by the "CCI" lubrication system which added the oil directly at the cylinder as well as at the crankshaft (Cylinder Crank Injection); Vans and Frontes thus equipped are called FE2 and FEA2 respectively.

In 1967 the all new three-cylinder Fronte 360 replaced the FEA. A year later, in March 1968, the Van received a reed valve engine for the FE3 model. This was discontinued in January 1969, when the three-cylinder Fronte Van appeared. Two more Frontes came in fourth and eighth places. The winning driver was Osamu Mochizuki (望月 修) who crossed the finish line just ahead of teammate Haruhisa Fujita (藤田 晴久), both a full minute ahead of the third-placed Subaru 360.

Applications
 1963.03–1969.01 Suzulight 360 Van FE/FEB/FE2/FE3
 1963.03–1967.03 Suzulight Fronte FEA

L50
A water-cooled version of the FB, called the L50 since it was developed for the L50 Carry, appeared in March 1972 in the LJ20 Jimny. The L50 was only ever fitted to commercial vehicles as Suzuki's passenger cars were by now using the three-cylinder LC10 engine. The L50 was also fitted to the short-lived LS20 Fronte Van for just over a year. It continued to be used in the Fronte Van's replacement, the 1973 "Fronte Hatch".

This was also ready for the unleaded gasoline introduced to the Japanese market on 1 February 1975. For 1976 another horsepower was lost. With new rules for Kei cars, allowing for engines of up to 550 cc, the L50 gained a cylinder and a new name in April 1976. The two-cylinder version was finally discontinued in July, when the Suzuki Fronte Hatch was also updated with the new three-cylinder engine.

Applications
 1972.05–1976.04 Suzuki Carry L50
 1972.03–1973.04 Suzuki Fronte Van LS20
 1973.04–1976.07 Suzuki Fronte Hatch LS30
 1972.03–1976.05 Suzuki Jimny LJ20

L60
The L60 was a rare, export-only version with a larger displacement. Like the L50, it is a water-cooled two-stroke twin, but has  from a  bore and stroke. Appearing only in the L60 Carry, it was fitted to provide more power and torque to export markets not having regulations regarding engine size.

Applications
 1974–1976 Suzuki Carry L60 (export only)

LJ50
The LJ50 engine gained a cylinder to meet new kei car regulations regarding maximum displacement. It first appeared for the home market in June 1976 as the Jimny 55, subsequent to the changing of Kei car rules while also addressing stricter emission standards. The  straight-three engine remained a two-stroke; while power remained  at 4500 rpm more low-end torque was on offer -  at 3000 rpm. Both figures were obtained at considerably lower engine speeds.

The LJ50 was also fitted to several generations of the Carry microtruck and van, until July 1986.

Applications
 1976.05–1976.09 Suzuki Carry 55 ST10/ST11
 1976.09–1979.04 Suzuki Carry Wide 550 ST20
 1979.04–1985.03 Suzuki Carry ST30/ST31 
 1985.03–1986.07 Suzuki Carry DA81T
 1976.07–1979.04 Suzuki Hatch 550 SH10
 1975.10–1981.05 Suzuki Jimny 55 SJ10, sold as "Suzuki LJ50" abroad
 1981.05–1987.11 Suzuki Jimny 550 SJ30

T5 series
In response to the changed Kei car regulations taking effect on January 1, 1976, Suzuki developed the T5A version for passenger car use. Passenger car engines were required to pass stricter emissions regulations than the LJ50, which was for commercial vehicles. The unrelated T4A engine was unable to meet these requirements and was also of only , so it was replaced in October 1977. The name refers to it being the first ("A") engine with a 0.5-litre displacement. At the same time, this engine (with the same power specifics) was also fitted to the sporting looking Suzuki Cervo microcoupé. This could finally meet the tighter 1978 (53年) emissions standards, which the T4A had not been able to do. The emissions system was called "TC53", for Twin Catalyst, year 53 of the Showa era (1978 in the common era).

In May 1979 the T5B appeared, simply a T5A engineered to be installed in a front-engine, front-wheel-drive layout. As for specifications, the only difference was that maximum power was now reached at 5500 rpm. This was installed in the all-new Alto/Fronte hatchback, alongside a new four-stroke engine called the F5A. In 1981 the T5B was discontinued, although the LJ50 sister version continued to be built until late 1987.

Applications
T5A:
 1977.10–1979.04 Suzuki Fronte 7-S SS20
 1977.10–1982.06 Suzuki Cervo SS20
T5B:
 1979.05–1981.09 Suzuki Alto SS30V
 1979.05–1981.05 Suzuki Fronte SS30S

See also
List of Suzuki engines

References
 
 
 

FB
Two-stroke gasoline engines
1961 introductions
Straight-twin engines
Straight-three engines
Gasoline engines by model